Higgins Canyon is a steep-sided, ice-filled canyon immediately east of Schulthess Buttress, on the north side of Buckeye Table in the Ohio Range of the Horlick Mountains in Antarctica. It was named by the Advisory Committee on Antarctic Names for Merwyn D. Higgins, a geologist with the Ohio State University expedition to the Horlick Mountains in 1961–62.

References

Canyons and gorges of Antarctica
Landforms of Marie Byrd Land